Arthur Rhys Barrand (28 October 1861 – 3 August 1941) was a British Liberal Party politician.

Background
Barrand was born the son of Isaac Andrew Barrand in Stoke Newington. He was educated at Birkbeck School, Kingsland and at Finsbury Technical College. In 1889 he married Emily Brydon Schofield of Manchester. They settled in Bycullah Road, Enfield. He retired to live in Dunbar Road, Bournemouth.

Professional career
Barrand worked as an actuary from 1895 until he was called to bar by the Middle Temple in 1906. He was the joint author of 'Bunyon's Law of Life Assurance' (5th edition). He was a financier and director of an insurance company and an Assistant Manager of the Prudential Assurance Company.

Political career
Barrand was selected as Liberal candidate for Pudsey in 1914 for an election that was deferred due to the outbreak of war. Standing as a Coalition Liberal at the 1918 general election, he was elected Member of Parliament (MP) for the Pudsey and Otley division of the West Riding of Yorkshire. As a holder of the Coalition Coupon, he did not face a Unionist opponent in 1918. At the 1919 Spen Valley by-election he visited the constituency to speak in support of the Liberal candidate and against the Coalition Liberal candidate. This action ultimately led to the Unionists decision to oppose him at a future election. After 4 years in the House of Commons he was defeated at the 1922 general election by the Unionist Frederick Fawkes. He not stand again.

Electoral record

References

External links
 

1861 births
1941 deaths
Liberal Party (UK) MPs for English constituencies
UK MPs 1918–1922
Members of the Middle Temple